Aleksandr Kulikov may refer to:
 Aleksandr Vladimirovich Kulikov (born 1988), Russian footballer
 Alexandr Kulikov (canoeist) (born 1997), Kazakhstani slalom canoeist
 Aleksandr Kulikov (ice hockey), Soviet and Russian ice hockey player and coach in 1976 Canada Cup